Cryptostomata is an order of fossil bryozoans that lived from the Ordovician to the Permian.

References

Prehistoric bryozoans
Stenolaemata
Ordovician bryozoans
Permian invertebrates
Protostome orders
Ordovician first appearances
Permian extinctions